Cedric Badolo (born 4 November 1998) is a Burkinabé professional footballer who plays as a midfielder for Sheriff Tiraspol.

Club career

FK Pohronie
Badolo made his Fortuna Liga debut for Pohronie in the club's premier first division match against Slovan Bratislava on 20 July 2019 at Mestský štadión.

He scored his first goal for Pohronie after a pass from Peter Mazan in a match against iClinic Sereď. Badolo's goal was the winning one of the 2:1 game of Pohronie.

Sheriff Tiraspol
On 9 February 2022, Sheriff Tiraspol announced the signing of Badolo.

International career
Badolo received his first national team nomination from Oscar Barro in March 2022, ahead of friendly fixtures against Kosovo and Belgium. He debuted on 24 March 2022 at Fadil Vokrri Stadium, coming on as a second half substitute against Kosovo, with the score at 3-0 for the European team. Following his replacement of Bryan Dabo after 63 minutes of play, Badolo witnessed two further goals by Kosovo, through Milot Rashica and Toni Domgjoni within some ten minutes of his arrival, to seal the 5-0 defeat. At home, the result was described as 'sinking' and was partly attributed to forced absences. 

Days later, on 29 March 2022, Badolo similarly appeared as a second half substitute at Constant Vanden Stock Stadium during a match against Belgium. As he replaced Cyrille Bayala less than an hour into the match, The Stallions were trailing 2-0. While on pitch, Badolo witnessed Christian Benteke's goal, which sealed the score line of the match at 3-0.

Honours
Salitas
Coupe du Faso: 2018

Personal life
Badolo is a practicing Christian. He is fluent in French.

References

External links
 
 
 Futbalnet profile 
 

1998 births
Living people
Sportspeople from Ouagadougou
21st-century Burkinabé people
Burkinabé footballers
Burkinabé expatriate footballers
Burkinabé Christians
Burkina Faso youth international footballers
Burkina Faso international footballers
Association football midfielders
US des Forces Armées players
Salitas FC players
Kawkab Marrakech players
FK Pohronie players
FC Sheriff Tiraspol players
Burkinabé Premier League players
Botola players
Slovak Super Liga players
Moldovan Super Liga players
Expatriate footballers in Morocco
Burkinabé expatriate sportspeople in Morocco
Expatriate footballers in Slovakia
Burkinabé expatriate sportspeople in Slovakia
Expatriate footballers in Moldova
Burkinabé expatriate sportspeople in Moldova
Francophone people